George Trebeck (1800–1825) was born in Middlesex, England in the year 1800.  He moved to Calcutta, West Bengal circa 1815 with his father Charles Trebeck and brother of the same name.  George Trebeck, who was trained as a solicitor, was recruited by William Moorcroft at the age of 19 as his geographer and draftsman and second-in-charge of an expedition to Central Asia, ostensibly to find horses. Along with Moorcroft, Trebeck travelled through the Himalayan provinces of United Provinces, the Punjab, Ladakh, Kashmir, Peshawar, Kabul, Kunduz and Bokhara. They were unable to purchase horses. During the return journey, both Moorcroft and Trebeck died of illness, Trebeck a few months after Moorcroft in late 1825, in Mazar, Afghanistan.

An abridged version of the journals of Moorcroft and Trebeck was published posthumously in London in 1841. Called Travels in the Himalayan Provinces of Hindustan and the Punjab in Ladakh and Kashmir in Peshawar, Kabul, Kunduz and Bokhara From 1819 to 1825 (in two volumes), it remains the sole literary legacy of the duo.

References

 Sources

Further reading
 Phillimore III page 508
 George Trebeck's Will held in the East India Centre, British Library, St Pancras, London, England 'Indexes to Wills - Bengal, 1780–1909' IOR reference: L/AG/34/29/1-154
 George Trebeck's Burial Record East India Register, East India Centre, British Library, St Pancras, London, England
 The Moorcroft Collection, East India Centre, British Library, St Pancras, London, England MSS EUR/F 37 (Private Papers)
 Families in British India Society (see article Families In British India Society)
 Travels in the Himalayan Provinces of Hindustan and the Punjab in Ladakh and Kashmir in Peshawar, Kabul, Kunduz and Bokhara From 1819 to 1825  Volume II by William Moorcroft and George Trebeck, Publisher:Elibron Classics

External links
 

1800 births
1825 deaths
People from Middlesex
English geographers
English explorers
Explorers of Asia
Explorers of Central Asia